Kaattumaina is a 1963 Indian film, directed by M. Krishnan Nair and produced by P. Subramaniam. Shot simultaneously in Malayalam and Tamil languages, the film stars J. Sasikumar, K. V. Shanthi, Muttathara Soman and Muthukulam Raghavan Pillai. The Malayalam version was released on 31 August 1963, and the Tamil version on 18 October.

Plot

Cast 
J. Sasikumar
K. V. Shanthi
Muttathara Soman
Rajasree
Vijayalalitha
Muthukulam Raghavan Pillai
C. L. Anandan
Jose Prakash
Sheela
Prem Nazir

Soundtrack 
The music was composed by Br Lakshmanan and the lyrics were written by Thirunayinaarkurichi Madhavan Nair.

References

External links 
 

1960s Malayalam-language films
1960s Tamil-language films
1963 films
Films directed by M. Krishnan Nair
Films shot in Kollam
Indian multilingual films
Films scored by Br Lakshmanan